Neptune With Fire is the debut release by Los Angeles-based metal band Ancestors.

Neptune With Fire is a concept album that tells of metaphorical characters (namely Neptune on the title track and Orcus on the first track), and their cosmic, psychological journey through war, celebration, remorse and revelation.  The character of Neptune was written as an immortal personification of the mortal man, and for the band, his plight was conceived of as a way of realizing their own epistemological struggles.

The album's artwork was created by Arik Roper.

Track listing

References

External links
Neptune With Fire review at Pitchfork Media
Neptune With Fire review on ArtRocker
Neptune With Fire review in Abort Magazine
Neptune With Fire review in LA Record

2008 debut albums
Ancestors (band) albums
Concept albums